German submarine U-423 was a Type VIIC U-boat of Nazi Germany's Kriegsmarine during World War II.

She carried out one patrol. She did not sink or damage any ships.

She was sunk by a Norwegian aircraft northwest of the Faroe Islands on 17 June 1944.

Design
German Type VIIC submarines were preceded by the shorter Type VIIB submarines. U-423 had a displacement of  when at the surface and  while submerged. She had two shafts and two  propellers.

U-423 was fitted with five  torpedo tubes (four fitted at the bow and one at the stern), fourteen torpedoes, one  SK C/35 naval gun, 220 rounds, and two twin  C/30 anti-aircraft guns. The boat had a complement of between forty-four and sixty.

Service history
The submarine was laid down on 16 March 1942 at the Danziger Werft (yard) at Danzig (now Gdansk), as yard number 124, launched on 7 November and commissioned on 3 March under the command of Oberleutnant zur See Joachim Methner.

She served with the 8th U-boat Flotilla from 3 March 1943 until her loss.

Patrol and loss
The boat's only patrol commenced with her departure from Kiel on 9 June 1944. On 17 June, she was sunk northeast of the Faroe Islands by depth charges dropped from a Norwegian PBY Catalina flying boat of No. 333 Squadron RAF.

Fifty-three men went down with the U-boat; there were no survivors.

References

Bibliography

External links

German Type VIIC submarines
U-boats commissioned in 1943
U-boats sunk in 1944
U-boats sunk by Norwegian aircraft
U-boats sunk by depth charges
1942 ships
Ships built in Danzig
Ships lost with all hands
World War II submarines of Germany
World War II shipwrecks in the Norwegian Sea
Maritime incidents in June 1944